West Bay is an area in Doha, Qatar that encompasses the city's east coast districts, namely, Al Qassar, Al Dafna, West Bay Lagoon and Onaiza. West Bay includes many modern buildings unlike other, older districts of Doha. Some of the tallest skyscrapers in Qatar are found in this area.

History
In Qatar's first census conducted in 1986, West Bay was the tentative name for seven newly established zones of Doha along the coastline: Zone 60 and Zone 62 to Zone 67. Contemporary usage of the term refers to all the districts currently occupying these zones, which currently includes Al Qassar, Al Dafna, West Bay Lagoon (official name Leqtaifiya), Onaiza, and Hazm Al Markhiya.

Transport
Mowasalat manages a shuttle service for the West Bay Area under the auspices of the Ministry of Transport and Communication. The sole route is circular, running through 36 stops at 12-minute intervals from 6 AM to 9 PM on all days of the week. It passes through most of the hotel and business districts in West Bay.

The underground West Bay Metro Station began operation on 8 May, 2019. It was launched during Phase 1 of Doha Metro's Red Line North.

Education
One of Lycée Franco-Qatarien Voltaire's branches, Qatar's French international school, is located in West Bay. Schools in West Bay include:

Gallery

See also
List of tallest buildings in Qatar

References

Doha